A chemical garden is a set of complex biological-looking structures created by mixing inorganic chemicals. Chemical gardening is an experiment in chemistry usually performed by adding metal salts, such as copper sulfate or cobalt(II) chloride, to an aqueous solution of sodium silicate (otherwise known as waterglass). This results in the growth of plant-like forms in minutes to hours.

The chemical garden was first observed and described by Johann Rudolf Glauber in 1646. In its original form, the chemical garden involved the introduction of ferrous chloride (FeCl2) crystals into a solution of potassium silicate (K2SiO3).

Process 

The chemical garden relies on most transition metal silicates being insoluble in water and colored.

When a metal salt, such as cobalt chloride, is added to a sodium silicate solution, it will start to dissolve. It will then form insoluble cobalt silicate by a double displacement reaction. This cobalt silicate is a semipermeable membrane. Because the ionic strength of the cobalt solution inside the membrane is higher than the sodium silicate solution's, which forms the bulk of the tank contents, osmotic effects will increase the pressure within the membrane. This will cause the membrane to tear, forming a hole. The cobalt cations will react with the silicate anions at this tear to form a new solid. In this way, growths will form in the tanks; they will be colored (according to the metal cation) and may look like plant-like structures. The crystals formed from this experiment will grow upwards, since the pressure at the bottom of the tank is higher than the pressure closer to the top of the tank, therefore forcing the crystals to grow upwards.

The upward direction of growth depends on the density of the fluid inside the semi-permeable membrane of the "plant" being lower than that of the surrounding waterglass solution. If one uses a metal salt that produces a very dense fluid inside the membrane, the growth is downward. For example, a green solution of trivalent chromium sulfate or chloride refuses to crystallize without slowly changing into the violet form, even if boiled until it concentrates into a tarry mass. That tar, if suspended in the waterglass solution, forms downward twig-like growths. This is because all the fluid inside the membrane is too dense to float and thereby exerts an upward pressure. The concentration of sodium silicate becomes important in growth rate.

After the growth has ceased, the sodium silicate solution can be removed by a continuous addition of water at a very slow rate. This prolongs the life of the garden.

In one specific experimental variation, researchers produced the chemical garden inside test tubes.

Common salts used 

Common salts used in a chemical garden include:

 Aluminium potassium sulfate: White
 Copper(II) sulfate:  Blue
 Chromium(III) chloride: Green
 Nickel(II) sulfate: Green
 Iron(II) sulfate: Green
 Iron(III) chloride: Orange
 Cobalt(II) chloride: Purple
 Calcium chloride: White
 Zinc sulfate: White

Practical uses 
While at first the chemical garden may appear to be primarily a toy, some serious work has been done on the subject. For instance, this chemistry is related to the setting of Portland cement, the formation of hydrothermal vents, and during the corrosion of steel surfaces on which insoluble tubes can be formed.

The nature of the growth of the insoluble silicate tubes formed within chemical gardens is also useful in understanding classes of related behavior seen in fluids separated by membranes. In various ways, the growth of the silicate tubes resembles the growth of spikes or blobs of ice extruded above the freezing surface of still water, the patterns of growth of gum drying as it drips from wounds in trees such as Eucalyptus, and the way molten wax forms twig-like growths, either dripping from a candle, or floating up through cool water.

Paleontology 
If the conditions are good, chemical gardens can also occur in nature. There is evidence from paleontology, that such chemical gardens may fossilize. Such pseudofossils can be very difficult to distinguish from fossilized organisms. Indeed, some of the earliest purported fossils of life might be fossilized chemical gardens.

Mixing iron-rich particles with alkaline liquids containing the chemicals silicate or carbonate have created biological-looking structures. Such structures may appear to be biological and/or fossils. According to researchers, "Chemical reactions like these have been studied for hundreds of years but they had not previously been shown to mimic these tiny iron-rich structures inside rocks. These results call for a re-examination of many ancient real-world examples to see if they are more likely to be fossils or non-biological mineral deposits."

One use of the study of chemical gardening is to be better able to distinguish biological structures, including fossils, from non-biological structures on the planet Mars.

See also 

 Mercury beating heart
 Barking dog reaction

References

External links 

 Chemical Garden at The Periodic Table of Videos (University of Nottingham)
 Chemical Gardens (Colloidal garden) at (http://chemistry-chemists.com)
Chemobrionics (COST Action linking European research groups to stimulate innovative and high-impact interdisciplinary scientintific research on chemical gardens)

Chemical processes
Chemistry classroom experiments
Articles containing video clips